Pileh Darbon (also Romanized as Pīleh Dārbon; also known as Phileh Darab, Pilderbend, and Takhteh Pol) is a village in Pir Bazar Rural District, in the Central District of Rasht County, Gilan Province, Iran. At the 2006 census, its population was 809, in 240 families.

References 

Populated places in Rasht County